Azerbaijan Today is a bi-monthly English-language magazine published in Azerbaijan. The magazine was established in January 2001. It primarily covers articles on politics, business and economics.

References

External links
 
 

2001 establishments in Azerbaijan
Bi-monthly magazines
Business magazines
English-language magazines
Magazines established in 2001
Magazines published in Azerbaijan
News magazines published in Asia
Political magazines
Mass media in Baku